Howard Robert Horvitz ForMemRS NAS AAA&S APS NAM (born May 8, 1947) is an American biologist best known for his research on the nematode worm Caenorhabditis elegans, for which he was awarded the 2002 Nobel Prize in Physiology or Medicine, together with Sydney Brenner and John E. Sulston, whose "seminal discoveries concerning the genetic regulation of organ development and programmed cell death" were "important for medical research and have shed new light on the pathogenesis of many diseases".

Education and early life
Horvitz was born in Chicago, Illinois to Jewish parents, the son of Mary R. (Savit), a school teacher, and Oscar Freedom Horvitz, a GAO accountant. He majored in mathematics at Massachusetts Institute of Technology, where he joined Alpha Epsilon Pi and spent his summers working for IBM, at first wiring panels for accounting machines and then in his final summer helping to develop IBM's Conversational Programming System.

During his senior year, Horvitz took his first courses in biology and was encouraged by his professors to continue to study biology in graduate school, despite his limited coursework in the field. After he completed his undergraduate studies in 1968, he enrolled in graduate studies in biology at Harvard University, where he studied T4-induced modifications of E. coli RNA polymerase under the direction of Walter Gilbert and James Watson. He completed his PhD in 1974.

Career
In 1974, Horvitz took a postdoctoral position at the Laboratory of Molecular Biology (LMB) in Cambridge, England, where he worked with his future Nobel prize co-winners Sydney Brenner and John Sulston on the genetics and cell lineage of C. elegans. In 1978, Horvitz was offered a faculty position at MIT, where he is currently Professor of Biology and a member of the McGovern Institute for Brain Research. He is also an Investigator of the Howard Hughes Medical Institute.

Horvitz serves as the chair of the board of trustees for Society for Science & the Public and is a member of the USA Science and Engineering Festival's Advisory Board.

Research 
At LMB, Horvitz worked with Sulston to track every non-gonadal cell division that occurred during larval development, and published a complete description of these lineages in 1977. Later, in cooperation with Sulston and Martin Chalfie, Horvitz began investigations first characterizing several cell lineage mutants and then seeking genes that controlled cell lineage or that controlled specific linages. In 1981, they identified and characterized the gene lin-4, a "heterochronic" mutant that changes the timeline of cell fates.

In his early work at MIT, Horvitz continued his work on cell lineage and cell fate, using C. elegans to investigate whether there was a genetic program controlling cell death, or apoptosis. In 1986, he identified the first "death genes", ced-3 and ced-4. He showed that functional ced-3 and ced-4 genes were a prerequisite for cell death to be executed. He went on to show that another gene, ced-9, protects against cell death by interacting with ced-4 and ced-3, as well as identifying a number of genes that direct how a dead cell is eliminated. Horvitz showed that the human genome contains a ced-3-like gene.

Horvitz's later research continued to use C. elegans to analyze the genetic control of animal development and behavior, as well as to link discoveries in the nematode to human diseases, particularly cancer and neurodegenerative diseases such as amyotrophic lateral sclerosis (ALS). He made further advancements in defining the molecular pathway of programmed cell death, and has identified several key components, including: EGL-1, a protein which activates apoptosis by inhibiting CED-9; transcription factors ces-1 and ces-2, and ced-8, which controls the timing of cell death. He has also continued work on heterochronic mutants and other aspects of cell lineage, and established lines of research in signal transduction, morphogenesis, and neural development. Horvitz has collaborated with Victor Ambros and David Bartel on a project to characterize the complete set of the more than 100 microRNAs in the C. elegans genome.

Works

Robert Horvitz has over 255 publications, has been cited over 49,000 times and has an h-index of 108.

Awards and honors

1986 Spencer Award in Neurobiology from Columbia University
1986 Warren Triennial Prize from the Massachusetts General Hospital
1988 U.S. Steel Foundation Award in Molecular Biology from the U.S. National Academy of Sciences
1991 Member, U.S. National Academy of Sciences
1993 V.D. Mattia Award (Roche Institute of Molecular Biology)
1994 Member, American Academy of Arts and Sciences
1994 Hans Sigrist Prize from the University of Bern, Switzerland
1995 Charles A. Dana Award
1995 President of the Genetics Society of America
1996 Ciba-Drew Award for Biomedical Science
1997 Rosenstiel Award
1998 Fellow, American Academy of Microbiology
1998 Passano Award for the Advancement of Medical Science
1998 Alfred P. Sloan, Jr. Prize, General Motors Research Foundation 
1999 Gairdner Foundation International Award
2000 Paul Ehrlich and Ludwig Darmstaedter Prize
2000 Segerfalk Award
2000 March of Dimes Prize in Developmental Biology
2000 Louisa Gross Horwitz Prize for Biology or Biochemistry
2000 Grand Prix Charles-Leopold Mayer (French Academy of Sciences)
2001 Bristol-Myers Squibb Award for Distinguished Achievement in Neuroscience
2001 Genetics Society of America Medal
2002 Nobel Prize in Physiology or Medicine with Sydney Brenner and John Sulston
2002 Wiley Prize in Biomedical Sciences
2002 Gruber Prize in Geneticsgrom the Gruber Foundation
2004 Member, American Philosophical Society
2003 Member, Institute of Medicine
2007 UK Genetics Society Mendel Medal
 2009 Elected a Foreign Member of the Royal Society (ForMemRS)

See also
History of apoptosis research

References

Further reading

External links
 

1947 births
Living people
Nobel laureates in Physiology or Medicine
American Nobel laureates
Howard Hughes Medical Investigators
Jewish American scientists
Harvard University alumni
Fellows of the American Academy of Arts and Sciences
Members of the United States National Academy of Sciences
Members of the National Academy of Medicine
Foreign Members of the Royal Society
21st-century American biologists
Massachusetts Institute of Technology School of Science alumni
Caenorhabditis elegans
Members of the American Philosophical Society